Peyvand-e Olya (also Romanized as Peyvand-e ‘Olyā; also known as Peyvand-e Bālā, Paiwand, and Peyvand Bālā) is a village in Mud Rural District, Mud District, Sarbisheh County, South Khorasan Province, Iran. At the 2006 census, its population was 72, in 17 families.

References 

Populated places in Sarbisheh County